Jostin Francis is an Indian psychiatrist, academic, orator, critic and a writer of Malayalam literature. He is known for his studies and Public presentations regarding adult psychiatric disorders like schizophrenia, bipolar disorder, depression, anxiety disorder and obsessive–compulsive disorder. His observations and writings about alcohol dependence, child and adolescent psychiatry, evolutionary psychology, sexual diseases, and dementia are widely acknowledged. He currently works as a consultant psychiatrist at Government General Hospital, Kalpetta under the Indian state Kerala's government health services. His activities in the field of addiction treatment medicine are well-known.

Life and career 
Jostin Francis was born in a village named Kalloorkkad in Ernakulam district in the South Indian state of Kerala. He graduated in medicine (MBBS) at the Amala Institute of Medical Sciences and completed his Diplomate of National Board (DNB) in psychiatry from a World Health Organization (WHO)-accredited South Indian psychiatric institute and research center called Schizophrenia Research Foundation (SCARF) Chennai. Currently he is working in Kerala Government Health Services.
His observations regarding a serial killing case, publicly known as the Koodathai case, were intensely discussed by the Indian media.

Awards and honours
Francis received 'Media Special Appreciation Award' from K.K. Shailaja Teacher, Honourable Health Minister of Kerala in 2020.

References

External links
  Business contact information
  Facebook page
 Blog

Living people
Indian psychiatrists
Medical doctors from Kerala
Indian medical writers
Year of birth missing (living people)